Tom Phillips (born February 5, 1958) is an American former racing driver from Portland, Oregon. He finished in fifth place in the 1986 WCAR/SCCA Pro Formula Atlantic Championship with wins at Laguna Seca Raceway and the Tacoma Dome course. He made his CART Championship Car debut in October of that year at Laguna Seca in the #23 Dick Simon Racing Lola-Cosworth but was knocked out of the race after 8 laps due to engine trouble after qualifying 20th. The race would be his only CART appearance.

References

External links
Photo of Tom Phillips driving in CART at Laguna Seca

1962 births
Champ Car drivers
Atlantic Championship drivers
Living people
Racing drivers from Portland, Oregon